Tẹẹ, or Tai, is an Ogoni language and the language of the Tai tribe of the Ogoni people of Rivers State, Nigeria. It is to a limited degree mutually intelligible with Khana, the main Ogoni language, but its speakers consider it to be a separate language.

Phonology
The Tẹẹ sound system is typical of an Ogoni language and identical to that of Khana, with the exception of four or five voiceless sonorants not found in that language.

Vowels 
There are seven oral vowels, spelt (i e ẹ a ọ o u), and five nasal vowels,  (spelt this way also). All may occur in long or short forms.

Consonants 

A glottal stop  appears before any otherwise vowel-initial stem. The alveolar consonants are apical.

Tẹẹ includes a rather unusual series of voiceless sonorants. The voiceless palatal  sounds rather like the voiceless palatal fricative , but is not as noisy (that is, there is not much random-frequency noise in its sound spectrum). Similarly,  is a voiceless approximant, not a voiceless fricative . The voiceless bilabial nasal, is only known to occur in one word,  (an unidentified abdominal organ), and then only for some speakers. All of the voiceless sonorants are actually voiced during the second half of their enunciation. That is,  is pronounced  However, they are considerably shorter than their voiced homologues, and hence cannot be considered /hC/ sequences with an otherwise unattested consonant .

Tone 
 The high tone is indicated by an acute accent : á, ã́, é, ẹ́, ẽ́, í, ĩ́, ó, ọ́, ṍ, ú, ṹ;
 The low tone is indicated by a grave accent  : à, ã̀, è, ẹ̀, ẽ̀, ì, ĩ̀, ò, ọ̀, õ̀, ù, ũ̀;
 The middle tone is indicated with no diacritic.

References
Citations

Bibliography

Indigenous languages of Rivers State
Ogoni languages